Simon Beaumont (born 1975) is an Australian rules footballer.

Simon Beaumont may also refer to:

Characters
Simon Beaumont, character in Ravenswood (TV series)
Simon Beaumont, character in The Bill played by Nicholas Burns (actor)

Others
Simon Beaumont, candidate in Mersey St Marys
Simon van Beaumont, see Foppe van Aitzema